Sammy Fuentes (born February 18, 1964) in Loíza, Puerto Rico is a retired Puerto Rican boxer. On February 20, 1995, he defeated Fidel Avendano to win the WBO Light Welterweight title. Fuentes defended the title once against Hector Lopez before losing it to Giovanni Parisi. He retired with a record of 34 wins (KO 28), 18 losses, and 2 draws.

External links
 

Living people
1964 births
People from Loíza, Puerto Rico
Puerto Rican male boxers
Light-welterweight boxers